At least two ships of the Royal Norwegian Navy have been named HNoMS Stavanger, after the city of Stavanger:

, a  destroyer purchased from the Royal Navy in 1946 and broken up in 1967.
, an  launched in 1966 and expended as a target in 2001.

Royal Norwegian Navy ship names